Březiněves is a municipal district (městská část) and cadastral area (katastrální území) in Prague. It is located in the northern part of the city. As of 2018, there were 1576 inhabitants living in Březiněves.

The first written record of Březiněves is from the 12th century. The village became part of Prague in 1974 with the last enlargement of the city.

External links 
 Březiněves - Official homepage

Districts of Prague